"Talk About the Passion" is a song by the American alternative rock band R.E.M., released as the second single released from its debut album Murmur in 1983. It was released in Europe only, on 12" vinyl. This song failed to follow up on the success of "Radio Free Europe" released earlier in the year, as it did not chart. A live performance at Larry's Hideaway, Toronto, Ontario, Canada, from July 9, 1983, was released on the 2008 Deluxe Edition reissue of Murmur.

Michael Stipe has stated that "Talk About the Passion" was a song about hunger, but the lyrics were not clear enough, with the only direct reference in the song being to "empty mouths". The video, made in 1988 and featured on the compilations Pop Screen and When the Light Is Mine, made this meaning of the song more explicit by showing images of homeless people and images of an aircraft carrier, ending with the caption, "in 1987 the cost of one destroyer-class warship was 910 million dollars."

The song was included on R.E.M.'s first I.R.S. Records greatest-hits album, Eponymous, and released as the only single from that album in 1988.

Track listing
All songs written by Bill Berry, Peter Buck, Mike Mills and Michael Stipe unless otherwise indicated.

"Talk About the Passion" – 3:24
"Shaking Through" – 4:30
"Carnival of Sorts (Boxcars)" – 3:55
"1,000,000" – 3:07

References

1983 singles
R.E.M. songs
Macaronic songs
Songs about poverty
Songs written by Bill Berry
Songs written by Peter Buck
Songs written by Mike Mills
Songs written by Michael Stipe
I.R.S. Records singles
1981 songs
Songs based on actual events
French-language songs
Song recordings produced by Don Dixon (musician)
Song recordings produced by Mitch Easter
Music videos directed by Jem Cohen
Black-and-white music videos